Williams Township is an inactive township in Stone County, in the U.S. state of Missouri.

Williams Township was erected in 1851, taking its name from John B. Williams, a county official.

References

Townships in Missouri
Townships in Stone County, Missouri